Miguel Oliveira (born 1995) is a Portuguese motorcycle racer.

Miguel Oliveira may also refer to:
 Miguel Oliveira (footballer, born 1983), Portuguese football defender
 Miguel Oliveira (footballer, born 1994), Portuguese football goalkeeper

See also
 Miguel de Oliveira (1947–2021), former Brazilian boxer